Joshua Kipkemboi (born 22 February 1959) is a retired Kenyan athlete who specialised in the 3000 metres steeplechase. He represented his country at the 1987 World Championships reaching the final where he failed to finish the race. In addition, he won the silver medal at the 1990 Commonwealth Games as well as multiple medals on continental level.

His personal best in the event is 8:14.13 set in Koblenz in 1986.

International competitions

1Did not finish in the final

Personal bests
Outdoor
1500 metres – 3:38.4 (Kisumu 1989)
3000 metres – 7:48.19 (Seville 1988)
5000 metres – 13:39.8 (Koblenz 1983)
3000 metres steeplechase – 8:14.13 (Koblenz 1986)
Marathon – 2:11:45 (St. Paul 2002)

References

External links
All-Athletics profile

Living people
1959 births
Kenyan male steeplechase runners
Athletes (track and field) at the 1990 Commonwealth Games
World Athletics Championships athletes for Kenya
Commonwealth Games medallists in athletics
Commonwealth Games silver medallists for Kenya
African Games silver medalists for Kenya
African Games medalists in athletics (track and field)
Kenyan male cross country runners
Athletes (track and field) at the 1987 All-Africa Games
Medallists at the 1990 Commonwealth Games